Miroslav Svoboda is a Slovak football player and coach.

He has coached ŠK Slovan Bratislava and FC Spartak Trnava.

References

Slovak footballers
Czechoslovak footballers
Slovak football managers
Czechoslovak football managers
ŠK Slovan Bratislava managers
FC Spartak Trnava managers
Living people
Association footballers not categorized by position
Year of birth missing (living people)